The 1962 United States Senate election in Idaho took place on November 6, 1962. Incumbent Democratic Senator Frank Church won re-election to a second term.

Primary elections
Primary elections were held on June 6, 1962.

Democratic primary

Candidates
Frank Church, incumbent U.S. Senator

Results

Republican primary

Candidates
George V. Hansen, city commissioner of Pocatello, former mayor of Alameda
Jack Hawley, former member of the Idaho House of Representatives

Results

General election

Results

See also 
 1962 United States Senate elections

References

Bibliography
 
 

1962
Idaho
United States Senate